TVRI (Television of the Republic of Indonesia), legally  ( Public Broadcasting Institution Television of the Republic of Indonesia) is an Indonesian national public television network. Established on 24 August 1962, it is the oldest television network in the country. Its national headquarters is in Gelora, Central Jakarta.

TVRI monopolized television broadcasting in Indonesia until 24 August 1989, when the first commercial television station RCTI went on the air. Alongside RRI, TVRI was converted from a state-controlled broadcaster under government department into an independent public broadcaster on 18 March 2005, becoming the first public broadcaster in the country.

TVRI currently broadcasts throughout the country with three national channels as well as 32 regional stations. As of 2020 it has 361 transmitters; making it the network with the largest terrestrial coverage than any other television network in the country. Its funding primarily comes from annual state budget approved by the parliament, advertisement, and other services.

History

1962–1975: The idea and initial broadcast 
The initial idea to establish a television station in Indonesia was put forward by then Minister of Information Maladi as far as 1952. The argument at the time is that it would be useful for the socialization of the upcoming 1955 general election, but the idea was failed because the idea was deemed as too expensive by the cabinet.

As a part of the preparations for the 1962 Asian Games to be held in Jakarta, in 1961 the Indonesian government decided to include the establishment of a national television station. Later that year, the Television Preparation Committee was formed by the Ministry of Information. On 23 October, President Sukarno ordered to build a studio in the land originally planned for Academy of Information (AKPEN) in Senayan, Jakarta and two television towers, as well as preparing programs and human resources.

TVRI was formed based on the Decree of the Minister of Information of the Republic of Indonesia No. 20/SK/VII/61, then it became part of the Bureau of Radio and Television under the Asian Games IV Organizing Committee for the IV Asian Games that year. TVRI broadcast its first test transmission on the Independence Day celebrations from the Merdeka Palace on 17 August 1962. TVRI went on air, airing the 1962 Asian Games opening ceremony on 24 August 1962. Throughout the Games TVRI aired every event of the meet especiall those involving Indonesian athletes; live broadcasts were held from the morning to evening and delayed broadcasts were held from 20:45 until 23:00 WIB when it signed off for the night. With TVRI's presence, Indonesia became the sixth country in eastern Asia to introduce television, behind Japan, the Philippines, Thailand, China and South Korea.

TVRI began broadcasting advertisements starting March 1963. Later on 20 October 1963, the Yayasan TVRI (TVRI Foundation) was formally created as the official governing authority for the station with President of Indonesia as chairman. The foundation experience several changes and lasted until late 1990s.

Two years later, the first regional TVRI station opened in Yogyakarta. Later many regional TVRI stations were opened, including stations and studios in Bandung, Semarang, Medan, Surabaya, Makassar, Manado, Batam, Palembang, Denpasar and Balikpapan. In the years to come, TVRI had been airing as a network carrying programming from Jakarta supplemented by opt-out broadcasts from the regional stations.

1975–1998: Under the New Order 
In 1974, eight years after President Suharto took office, TVRI became a part of the Department of Information, with the status as a directorate. Its role was to inform the public about government policies. A year after, a decree instituted TVRI a dual status, as a part of the TVRI Foundation and a part of the directorate. In 1976, it began to be broadcast all over Indonesia via Palapa satellite.

The first colour television signal was transmitted via satellite transmission in 1979. The first colour news bulletins were Berita Nasional (National News), Dunia Dalam Berita (The World in News), breaking events segments on Laporan Khusus (Special Report) and Berita Terakhir (Latest News).

TVRI in the late 1970s and 1980s became a well-defined mass media component of the Department of Information, in early years it generating income from advertising slots. After enjoying income from advertisements for years, President Suharto in his speech abolished the advertisement on TVRI in 1981 in order to "better directing television to help the development programs and avoid negative effects that do not support the spirit of development". This policy would later be revoked after the reform era. In 1982 TVRI Tower was officially opened to broadcast a wider signal.

During the era, the government-backed TVRI progressively established television production studios and television stations in many provinces across the country. As of 1998, all provinces in Indonesia had their own TVRI regional station or production studio; including East Timor.

TVRI launched a second channel TVRI Programa Dua (TVRI Programme Two) in 1989 to attract Jakarta urban audience, with a single English-language news program Six Thirty Report for half an hour that began at 18:30 WIB; later Programa Dua became a local channel under the name TVRI Jakarta. However, in the same year TVRI lost its monopoly when the government's sixth Five Year Plan allowed private television networks, channels, and stations to begin broadcasting, the first commercial television network being RCTI.

In 1994, TVRI launched its teletext service TVRI-Text, in partnership with PT Pilar Kumalajaya, about four months after RCTI launched the first teletext in the country.

1998–2006: Transformation and restructurization 
After the start of the reform era, especially in 2000, TVRI's status was changed. Under a service corporation (Perusahaan Jawatan or Perjan) form, it became responsible firstly to the Ministry of Finance and was then turned into a limited company under the authority of the State Ministry of State-Owned Enterprises for organizational matters and Ministry of Finance for financial matters. Under this arrangement, TVRI broadcasts in accordance with the principles of public television such as independent, neutral and public interest-oriented. Later in 2002, the status of TVRI has changed again to a limited company (Perseroan Terbatas or PT), still under the two ministries.

The enactment of the Act No. 32/2002 on Broadcasting designated TVRI, along with RRI, as the public broadcasting institution (Lembaga penyiaran publik or LPP) and were removed from any direct governmental control. TVRI was given a transition period of 3 years from PT to public broadcasting form. The status then reaffirmed by Government Regulation (Peraturan Pemerintah) No. 13/2005. TVRI officially became LPP on 18 March 2005.

2006–present: Modernization and rebranding 
Following the government plan to introduce digital television in Indonesia, TVRI launched its digital broadcasting on 21 December 2010. Initially launched in Jakarta, Surabaya and Batam, TVRI also launched two digital terrestrial channels, which were the first of its kind in Indonesia: TVRI 3 (currently TVRI World) and TVRI 4 (currently TVRI Sport). The launch was attended by President Susilo Bambang Yudhoyono and Minister of Communications and Information Technology Tifatul Sembiring.

In 2017, the TVRI board of supervisors installed a well-known television figure, Helmy Yahya as the chief director and Apni Jaya Putra (former programming director at Kompas TV and employer of SCTV, RCTI and SUN TV) as the news and programming director. During the leadership of Helmy Yahya and Apni Jaya Putra, TVRI began to remodel its programming on a large scale.

On 29 March 2019, at the concert special Menggapai Dunia (Reaching the World), TVRI adopted its new logo as a part of the rebranding efforts. The new logo was actually decided to be released in the fourth quarter of 2018, but for several reasons, it was postponed to the end of March 2019. At the same time, all TVRI regional stations have changed their logo in front of their respective studios.

In August 2019, TVRI together with two national private networks (Metro TV and Trans7) and Ministry of Communication and Information Technology officially launched digital television broadcasts for border regions in Nunukan Regency, North Kalimantan. With the launch, the government hoped that people in all regions of Indonesia can watch television with high quality.

A proposed new Broadcasting Act currently in the making, replacing Act No. 32/2002, would merge TVRI with RRI into RTRI (Radio Televisi Republik Indonesia, Radio [and] Television of the Republic of Indonesia).

Structure
TVRI is designated as public broadcasting institution per Act No. 32 of 2002 on Broadcasting, which defined as a "legal entity established by the state, independent, neutral, not commercial, and has the function to provide services for the public benefit". Its duty, according to Government Regulation No. 13 of 2005, is "to provide the healthy information, education and entertainment services, (maintain) social control and unity, and preserve the nation's culture for the whole public benefit by organizing television broadcast that reaches all parts of the Unitary State of the Republic of Indonesia".

TVRI organization structure consists of five Board of Supervisors (Dewan Pengawas) appointed by the People's Representative Council (DPR) and six Board of Directors (Dewan Direksi) appointed by the Board of Supervisors. Both are sworn in by the President, serve for five years and renewable once.

According to article 15 of the Broadcasting Act, TVRI is funded by several sources such as broadcasting fees, annual state budget (drafted by the government and approved by the DPR), community contribution, and advertisement, as well as other legal efforts related to its broadcasting operation. In fact, as of today the broadcasting fee is yet to be implemented, and for "other legal efforts" TVRI is asked to generate "non-tax state revenue" by various funding sources besides annual state budget; such as website ads, training service, professional certification, assets rent, program production, multiplexing service, and programming royalty. Previously, "television fee" has existed to supplement TVRI funding besides the government budget until the 1990s, but later abolished.

As of 2018 TVRI has approximately 4,300 employees, with an estimated 1,800 of whom being based in Jakarta. 90% of its employees are civil servants under Ministry of Communication and Information Technology, though the network is not a part of the ministry.

Services

Channels
TVRI currently operates three national channels and a dedicated regional channel:
 TVRI: The main channel of TVRI, it broadcasts information and educational content as well as entertainment for 24 hours a day.
TVRI regional station: The channel hosts TVRI regional stations by their respective on-air names. In Jakarta, TVRI Jakarta serves as a local station in both analog (until 2022) and digital terrestrial broadcast. See #Regional stations for lists.
 TVRI World: The channel broadcasts TVRI programming in English subtitle that targeted for international audience, previously known as TVRI Kanal 3.
 TVRI Sport: The channel broadcasts sports programming as well as simulcasting live sports events from the TVRI main channel in high definition.

Regional stations

TVRI has 32 regional stations covering all provinces of Indonesia, shown below in their native names and broadcast area:

 TVRI Aceh (Aceh)
 TVRI Sumatera Utara (North Sumatra)
 TVRI Sumatera Barat (West Sumatra)
 TVRI Riau (Riau)
 TVRI Kepulauan Riau (Riau Islands)
 TVRI Jambi (Jambi)
 TVRI Bengkulu (Bengkulu)
 TVRI Sumatera Selatan (South Sumatra)
 TVRI Bangka Belitung (Bangka Belitung Islands)
 TVRI Lampung (Lampung)
 TVRI Jakarta (Jakarta and Banten)
 TVRI Jawa Barat (West Java)
 TVRI Jawa Tengah (Central Java)
 TVRI Yogyakarta (Special Region of Yogyakarta)
 TVRI Jawa Timur (East Java)
 TVRI Bali (Bali)
 TVRI NTB (West Nusa Tenggara)
 TVRI NTT (East Nusa Tenggara)
 TVRI Kalimantan Barat (West Kalimantan)
 TVRI Kalimantan Tengah (Central Kalimantan)
 TVRI Kalimantan Timur (East Kalimantan)
 TVRI Kalimantan Selatan (South Kalimantan)
 TVRI Kalimantan Utara (North Kalimantan)
 TVRI Sulawesi Utara (North Sulawesi)
 TVRI Gorontalo (Gorontalo)
 TVRI Sulawesi Tengah (Central Sulawesi)
 TVRI Sulawesi Barat (West Sulawesi)
 TVRI Sulawesi Tenggara (Southeast Sulawesi)
 TVRI Sulawesi Selatan (South Sulawesi)
 TVRI Maluku (Maluku and North Maluku)
 TVRI Papua Barat (West Papua and Southwest Papua)
 TVRI Papua (Papua, Central Papua, South Papua and Highland Papua)

A former regional station for East Timor, TVRI Dili, ceased operation in 1999. East Timor national broadcaster RTTL currently takes its place.

Online services
TVRI currently maintain two online services. TVRI Klik, launched in 2018, is the primarily online streaming service for all TVRI channels, as well as its regional stations. TVRI VoD is the network's video-on-demand service. Both services could be accessed from their dedicated Android and iOS apps as well as their website.

Besides TVRI Klik, the channels and regional stations streaming service can also be found on the network's official website, YouTube, and other social media where available.

TVRI has its own news portal on TVRINews.com. The portal, which is active as far as 2014, has undergone several changes since.

Others
TVRI has an educational center called Pusat Pendidikan dan Pelatihan TVRI (Pusdiklat TVRI, TVRI Educational and Training Center) which provides television skill training.

TVRI also manages Studio Alam TVRI (literally "TVRI Natural Studio"), an outdoor studio in Sukmajaya, Depok, West Java. It is a green open space which is used for the production of several TVRI shows, and is also used as a recreational area.

Criticism and controversies

Structural problems

Corruption scandals
In 2008, former TVRI President Director, Sumita Tobing was arrested due to alleged corruption in the procurement of 50 cameras worth 5.2 billion rupiah. She was found guilty in 2012, and imprisoned for 1 year and 6 months in 2014.

In 2013, TVRI Director of Finance Eddy Machmudi Effendi was sentenced to 8 years 6 months in prison due to a scandal involving Director of News and Programming Irwan Hendarmin and Indonesian senior comedian Mandra, regarding purchasing of programs.

Broadcasting of political events
On 6 June 2013, TVRI aired a delayed broadcast of the Muktamar Khilafah (Caliphate Conference) organized by Hizb ut-Tahrir Indonesia (HTI) in Gelora Bung Karno Stadium, Jakarta. The Indonesian Broadcasting Commission (KPI) Commissioner, Idy Muzayyad assessed that TVRI as a public broadcasting institution was "experiencing national disorientation" by broadcasting this event because "HTI's ideology is questioning the state ideology and nationalism, as well as rejecting democracy"; but HTI spokesperson Ismail Yusanto says that "TVRI is a public broadcaster, and HTI is also a part of the public" and the broadcast is "a part of the public's right to be broadcast and heard". TVRI was subsequently warned by KPI that they could face sanctions for the broadcast.

Later on 15 September, TVRI aired a delayed broadcast of Democratic Party convention for more than 2 hours, the political party of which was founded by the incumbent president Susilo Bambang Yudhoyono. The broadcast again caused KPI sanctioning, due to the violation of political independence principle according to the law. However, TVRI directors secretary manager Usi Karundeng said that the network was never intervened or paid for by the party.

Dismissal of Helmy Yahya and internal chaos
On 6 December 2019, Helmy Yahya was temporarily dismissed as President Director for the 2017-2022 period by the TVRI Board of Supervisors led by Arief Hidayat Thamrin and replaced by acting President Director Supriyono. According to news sources in almost all mass media on 16 January 2020, Helmy Yahya was officially dismissed from his position by the board permanently and unilaterally, citing the "expensive" purchase of broadcast rights for the Premier League from Djarum-owned premium multi-platform network, Mola TV, a problem during Siapa Berani quiz show, and various other problems. Despite public pushback against the dismissal, the board continued to refuse Helmy Yahya's opposition to his dismissal until the election for the new president director to replace him.

On 17 January, 4,000 TVRI employees declared motion of no confidence to the Board of Supervisors. One day before, the board's room was sealed. As of 27 March 2020, another three directors (including News (Editor in Chief) and Program Director Apni Jaya Putra) were also temporarily dismissed for less than a month by the TVRI Board of Supervisors regarding the Helmy Yahya case. On 13 May, all of them (including Apni) were permanently dismissed.

On 27 May 2020, the TVRI Board of Supervisors appointed Indonesian advertising practitioner, journalist, and filmmaker/film director Iman Brotoseno as the new President Director for the remainder of the 2017–2022 period, replacing Helmy Yahya. The appointment caused controversy thanks to his endorsement of incumbent president Joko Widodo in the 2019 election, but he stated that he "would be independent and impartial". He's also criticized for his past posts on Twitter which included Indonesian colloquial terms for "porn" and porn films.

On 5 October 2020, the Board of Supervisors Arief Hidayat Thamrin was ultimately dismissed by first commission of People's Representative Council. However, Arief was suspended from power since 11 May.

Identity

List of logos

List of slogans 
Menjalin Persatuan dan Kesatuan (Weaving Unity and Oneness, 1962–2001)
Makin Dekat Di Hati (Going Closer to The Heart, 2001–2003)
Semangat Baru (New Spirit, 2003–2012)
Saluran Pemersatu Bangsa (The Nation's Unifying Channel, 2012–2019)
Media Pemersatu Bangsa (The Nation's Unifying Media, 2019–present)

See also
 Television in Indonesia
 Radio Republik Indonesia, the Indonesian public radio network
 Antara, the Indonesian news agency
 Public broadcasting in Indonesia

References

Further reading
Department of Information, Republic of Indonesia (1999) Indonesia 1999: An Official Handbook (No ISBN)
Schwartz, Adam (1994) A Nation in Waiting: Indonesia in the 1990s, Allen & Unwin.

External links

TVRI Video On-Demand
TVRI Klik

 
1962 establishments in Indonesia
Publicly funded broadcasters
Public broadcasting in Indonesia
Mass media companies of Indonesia
Television companies of Indonesia